Finnmark Dagblad is a Norwegian daily newspaper, published in Hammerfest, Norway.

The newspaper was founded in 1913 as Vestfinmarkens Socialdemokrat. It changed its name to Vestfinnmark Arbeiderblad in 1923. From 1940 the newspaper was taken over by Nasjonal Samling, and it was renamed first to Vestfinnmark Folkeblad, later to Finnmark Folkeblad. From 1946 it started publication as Vestfinnmark Arbeiderblad, and changed its name to Finnmark Dagblad in 1960. Finnmark Dagblad was the predominant owner of the Sami newspaper Min Áigi until its merge with Áššu to form Ávvir, which is owned by Finnmark Dagblad together with Altaposten.

References

Newspapers established in 1913
1913 establishments in Norway
Daily newspapers published in Norway
Amedia
Hammerfest